Torch This Place is an album made in 1999 by The Atomic Fireballs. It is the band's only full-length studio release.

Track listing
All songs by John Bunkley, except where indicated

"Man with the Hex" – 3:01
"Mata Hari" – 3:44
"Swing Sweet Pussycat" – 3:11
"Caviar & Chitlins" – 2:46
"Lover Lies" (Randall Sly) – 3:19
"Spanish Fly" – 3:28
"Pango Pango" – 3:37
"Hit by a Brick" – 4:09
"Calypso King" (Bunkley, Sly) – 2:45
"Drink Drank Drunk" – 2:56
"Flowers in the Sand" (Shawn Scaggs) – 2:44
"Starve a Fever" (James Bostek, Bunkley) – 3:45

Personnel

Band members
 James Bostek – trumpet
 Tony Buccilli – trombone
 John Bunkley – vocals
 Geoff Kinde – drums
 Duke Kingins – guitar
 Shawn Scaggs – double bass
 Eric Schabo – tenor saxophone
 Randy Sly – piano
 Tony James – electric guitar
 Vivian Bayubay – violin
 Andrea Rosario – cymbals

Additional musicians
 Luis Conte – percussion

Technical
 Bruce Fairbairn – producer
 Mike Plotnikoff – engineer, mixing
 George Marino – mastering

In pop culture
"Man with the Hex" was used in multiple entries in the Scooby-Doo franchise, appearing in both "Big Scare in the Big Easy", the fourth episode of the first season of What's New, Scooby-Doo?, as well as the 2002 feature-length film Scooby-Doo and its accompanying soundtrack album.

It was also featured on the soundtrack albums for movies including American Pie and The Haunted Mansion.

It was used in several TV shows, most notably Dawson's Creek, and was featured on both Dancing With the Stars and So You Think You Can Dance as a quickstep.

References

1999 albums
The Atomic Fireballs albums
Lava Records albums
Albums produced by Bruce Fairbairn
Albums recorded at Armoury Studios